Ian Philip Gibaut (born November 19, 1993) is an American professional baseball pitcher for the Cincinnati Reds of Major League Baseball (MLB). He has played in (MLB) for the Tampa Bay Rays, Texas Rangers, Minnesota Twins, and Cleveland Guardians.

Career

Amateur
The son of the cricketer Russel Gibaut, he attended Lamar High School in Houston, Texas and played college baseball at Tulane University. In 2014, he played collegiate summer baseball with the Hyannis Harbor Hawks of the Cape Cod Baseball League. He was drafted by the Tampa Bay Rays in the 11th round of the 2015 Major League Baseball Draft.

Tampa Bay Rays
Gibaut made his professional debut with the Princeton Rays and spent all of 2015 there, going 3-1 with a 2.12 ERA in 29.2 innings pitched in relief. In 2016, he pitched for the Bowling Green Hot Rods and Charlotte Stone Crabs where he compiled a combined 2-2 record, 2.53 ERA, and 1.25 WHIP in 57 total innings pitched, and in 2017 he pitched with Charlotte and the Montgomery Biscuits where he was 7-1 with a 2.21 ERA in 48 combined relief appearances between the two teams. Gibaut spent 2018 with the Durham Bulls, going 4-3 with a 2.09 ERA and a 1.00 WHIP, striking out 75 batters in 56 relief innings pitched.

The Rays added Gibaut to their 40-man roster after the 2018 season. He began 2019 on the injured list with Durham. After being activated, he pitched on a rehab assignment for Charlotte and then returned to Durham.

On July 5, 2019, the Rays promoted Gibaut to the major leagues. He made his major league debut on July 12 versus the Baltimore Orioles, allowing two runs and striking out two batters over two innings pitched.

On July 23, 2019, Gibaut was designated for assignment.

Texas Rangers
On July 28, 2019, Gibaut was traded to the Texas Rangers in exchange for cash considerations or a PTBNL. He was assigned to the Nashville Sounds following the trade. In 9 games for Texas in 2019, Gibaut went 1–1 with a 5.11 ERA over  innings. On December 2, 2019, Gibaut was non-tendered by Texas and became a free agent, but was re-signed to a minor league contract with an invitation to spring training on December 19, 2019. He appeared in 14 games for the Rangers in the 2020 season, collecting 14 strikeouts in  innings.

Minnesota Twins
On October 30, 2020, Gibaut was claimed off waivers by the Minnesota Twins. On February 19, 2021, Gibaut was outrighted off of the 40-man roster to make space for Matt Shoemaker and was invited to Spring Training as a non-roster invitee. After appearing in 27 games for the St. Paul Saints, posting a 1-3 record with a 7.20 ERA and 46 strikeouts, Gibaut's contract was selected by the Twins on August 27. Gibaut made 3 appearances for the Twins, recording a 2.70 ERA with 4 strikeouts. Gibaut was outrighted off of the 40-man roster on October 8. On October 14, Gibaut elected free agency.

Cleveland Guardians
On March 17, 2022, Gibaut signed a minor league contract with the Cleveland Guardians. The deal includes an invitation to the Guardians' 2022 major league spring training camp. On June 27, Gibaut was selected to the major league roster. He was designated for assignment the following day after appearing in one game for Cleveland.

Los Angeles Dodgers
On June 30, 2022, Gibaut was claimed off waivers by the Los Angeles Dodgers. He was designated for assignment on July 3 without appearing in a game.

Cincinnati Reds
On July 5, 2022, Gibaut was claimed off waivers by the Cincinnati Reds.

References

External links

Tulane Green Wave bio

1993 births
Living people
Lamar High School (Houston, Texas) alumni
Baseball players from Houston
Major League Baseball pitchers
Tampa Bay Rays players
Texas Rangers players
Minnesota Twins players
Cleveland Guardians players
Cincinnati Reds players
Tulane Green Wave baseball players
Hyannis Harbor Hawks players
Princeton Rays players
Bowling Green Hot Rods players
Charlotte Stone Crabs players
Montgomery Biscuits players
Durham Bulls players
Nashville Sounds players
St. Paul Saints players
American people of Jersey descent
2023 World Baseball Classic players